Mansour ul-Haq Awan (born 2 January 1942) is a Pakistani hurdler. He competed in the men's 400 metres hurdles at the 1964 Summer Olympics.

References

1942 births
Living people
Athletes (track and field) at the 1964 Summer Olympics
Pakistani male hurdlers
Olympic athletes of Pakistan
Place of birth missing (living people)